Waiting for the Moment is a solo album by keyboardist Stanley Cowell recorded in 1977 and first released on the Galaxy label.

Reception

In his review for AllMusic, Scott Yanow called it "An interesting if not quite essential program".

Track listing
All compositions by Stanley Cowell except as indicated
 "Ragtime"  (Jimmy Heath) - 3:04
 "Boogie Woogie" (Heath) - 3:00
 "Parisian Thoroughfare" (Bud Powell) - 3:32
 "'Round Midnight" (Thelonious Monk) - 7:36
 "Spanish Dancers" (Bill Lee) - 2:15
 "Sienna: Welcome, My Darling" - 5:16
 "Sienna: Waiting for the Moment" - 4:40
 "Coup De Grass" - 4:40
 "Today, What a Beautiful Day" - 5:17

Personnel
Stanley Cowell – piano, electric piano, clavinet, synthesizer, kalimba

References

1977 albums
Stanley Cowell albums
Galaxy Records albums